The Conway County Courthouse is located at 117 S. Moose Street in downtown Morrilton, Arkansas, the county seat of Conway County.  It is a -story masonry building, built out of red brick with trim of white concrete and white terra cotta.  Dominating the main facade are five slightly recessed bays, articulated by four two-story engaged round columns, and flanked by square pilasters.  The outer bays of the facade are each flanked by brick pilasters with cast terra cotta bases and capitals.  The courthouse was built in 1929 to a design by Arkansas architect Frank W. Gibb.

The building was listed on the National Register of Historic Places in 1989.

See also
National Register of Historic Places listings in Conway County, Arkansas

References

External links

Courthouses on the National Register of Historic Places in Arkansas
National Register of Historic Places in Conway County, Arkansas
Neoclassical architecture in Arkansas
Art Deco architecture in Arkansas
Government buildings completed in 1929
Buildings and structures in Morrilton, Arkansas
Individually listed contributing properties to historic districts on the National Register in Arkansas
Conway
1929 establishments in Arkansas